is a Japanese actress, voice actress and singer. Her major roles in anime include: Gō Seiba in Bakusō Kyōdai Let's & Go!!, Haruna Hiroko in Hamtaro,  Yoshino Shimazu in Maria-sama ga Miteru, Momoka Nishizawa in Sgt. Frog. In video games, she has voiced Athena Asamiya in  The King of Fighters since 1998, and voiced Coco Bandicoot in Crash Bandicoot series. She announced her marriage on July 1, 2020. She is the eldest daughter of Akutagawa Prize-winning author Natsuki Ikezawa and the granddaughter of Takehiko Fukunaga.

Filmography

Anime

Anime films

Live-action voice-over

Video games

Drama CDs

Other dubbing

Animation 
Rugrats (1991-2021) as Chuckie Finster
The Lorax (2012) as Mrs. Wiggins
Minions (2015) as Scarlet Overkill
Open Season (2006) as Giselle
Hotel Transylvania (2012) as Wanda
The Rugrats Movie (1998) as Chuckie Finster
Rugrats in Paris: The Movie (2000) as Chuckie Finster
Rugrats Go Wild (2003) as Chuckie Finster

Other media
Macne Nana, Macne Petit and Whisper☆Angel Sasayaki (Macne series)
 Pun-Colle ~voice actresses' legendary punk songs collection (2009) – songs "Basket Case" and "God Save the Queen"

References

External links
  
 

1975 births
Living people
Across Entertainment voice actors
Actresses from Athens
Japanese women pop singers
Japanese video game actresses
Japanese voice actresses
Japanese women essayists
Citizens of Japan through descent
Voice actresses from Kanagawa Prefecture
Voice actors from Kawasaki, Kanagawa
20th-century Japanese actresses
21st-century Japanese actresses
20th-century Japanese women writers
21st-century Japanese women writers
20th-century Japanese women singers
20th-century Japanese singers
21st-century Japanese women singers
21st-century Japanese singers
81 Produce voice actors